Annie Haslam is the third solo album by Renaissance vocalist Annie Haslam, released in 1989.

The album consisted mostly of original material and included covers of Mike Oldfield's "Moonlight Shadow", which had been a UK number 4 hit in 1983, and Rose Royce's 1978 UK number 3 hit "Wishing on a Star".

Track listing
 "Moonlight Shadow" (Mike Oldfield) - 3:35
 "The Angels Cry" (Justin Hayward) - 4:25
 "When a Heart Finds Another" (Peter Wolf, Ina Wolf, Martin Page) - 4:43
 "Let It Be Me" (Neil Lockwood) - 4:31
 "She's the Light" (Annie Haslam, Larry Fast) - 2:17
 "Celestine" (Haslam, Fast) - 4:51
 "Further from Fantasy" (Kit Hain, John DeNicola) - 4:19
 "Wishing on a Star" (Billie Rae Calvin) - 4:32
 "Wildest Dreams" (Peter Bliss, Todd Cerney) - 4:56
 "One More Arrow" (Jay Gruska, Val Hoebel) - 4:08
 "One Love" (Haslam, Bliss) - 4:04

Personnel

Musicians
Annie Haslam - lead and background vocals, vocal arrangements
Larry Fast - synthesizers and electronic drums
Justin Hayward - vocals and acoustic guitar on track 2
Mark Lampariello - guitars on tracks 1, 3, 4, 7, 8 and 10
Peter Bliss - background vocals, guitars and sequencer programming on track 9 and 11
David Rose - violin on tracks 2 and 11
Raphael Rudd - harp and piano on track 5, 6, and 11
Mel Collins - saxophone on track 4
Joe Franco - percussion and additional drums 
Robert Matarazzo - background vocals on track 4
John DeNicola - MIDI sequencer programming on track 7

Production
Larry Fast - producer, engineer on tracks 1, 4 and 10
Denny Bridges - engineer and mixing
Nelson Ayres - engineer on tracks 1, 4 and 10, assistant engineer
Mike Weisinger, Jeff Toone, Joe Gelchion, Richard Barraclough - assistant engineers
Vlado Meller - mastering
Michael Caplan - executive producer

References

1989 albums
Epic Records albums
Virgin Records albums